García brothers or Garcia Brothers may refer to:

Carpa García (or the Garcia Brothers Show), a Mexican American carpa (travelling circus tent show)
Latin Flavors, owned by the Garcia brothers
Café Novelty, first owners were the García brothers
The Brothers García, an American sitcom

Music
The Garcia Brothers (album), an album by Axe Murder Boyz
The Garcia Brothers (Los Angeles band) 1990s
Garcia Brothers, a Native American musical group in Ohkay Owingeh, New Mexico.
Los Garcia Brothers, see 2008 – 28th Tejano Music Awards
Mike and James Garcia, the hip-hop duo Axe Murder Boyz

Sports
the Garcia brothers, Deportivo Indiana Gladiadores U-17 Team
Miguel Ángel García (boxer) and his brother Robert Garcia (American boxer)
Raúl García (boxer) and his brother Ramón García Hirales
Carlos Garcia (American soccer) and his brother Gabe Garcia (soccer)